Collix stenoplia is a moth in the  family Geometridae. It is found on Peninsular Malaysia and Borneo. Its habitat consists of montane areas.  It has medium-brown wings with one row of pale dots along the distal edge.

References

Moths described in 1929
stenoplia